The Raleigh Ringers is a concert handbell choir based in Raleigh, North Carolina. The Raleigh Ringers perform interpretations of sacred, secular and popular music, including rock 'n' roll tunes, arranged for handbells. The Raleigh Ringers has performed in 39 states and the District of Columbia, in several cities in France and England, and in Canada.

The group plays on the largest set of handbell or handbell-like instruments in the world – 36½ octaves composed of 494 individual pieces of equipment.

History

The Raleigh Ringers was founded by director David M. Harris in 1990. The nonprofit organization consists of auditioned members and is not affiliated with a church or religious institution.

Awards and nominations

In 2014 the group was nominated for a Midsouth Emmy in the "Entertainment" category. This was the first time any handbell group received an Emmy nomination.

The Raleigh Ringers Series 
The Raleigh Ringers Series is a collection of advanced handbell music that highlights original compositions and arrangements suitable for performance. To date there are 34 pieces in this series.

PBS Specials 
The Raleigh Ringers have two hour-long programs in syndication with American Public Television.

Recordings

The Raleigh Ringers have released 6 CDs and 2 videos.

CDs 
The Raleigh Ringers

Impressions of the Season

More

Going to Extremes

A Wintry Mix

Passages

Progressions

Videos 
One Winter Evening at Meymandi (DVD and VHS) - Selections from this were included in the PBS special "One Winter Evening at Meymandi."

A December Tradition (DVD and Blu-Ray) - Selections from this were included in the PBS special "Holiday Handbells."

Additional works 
The Raleigh Ringers perform on the Grand Larsen-y CD along with Terry Rhodes, soprano, Ellen Williams, mezzo-soprano, Benton Hess, piano, Steven Reis, cello.

References 

Handbell ringers
Musical groups from Raleigh, North Carolina